The men's 50 kilometres walk event at the 1971 Pan American Games was held in Cali on 3 August.

Results

References

Athletics at the 1971 Pan American Games
1971